Brian Lee Simmons (born September 4, 1973) is a former Major League Baseball (MLB) outfielder. He played for the Chicago White Sox and Toronto Blue Jays over parts of three seasons.

Career
Simmons attended the University of Michigan, and in 1994 he played collegiate summer baseball with the Cotuit Kettleers of the Cape Cod Baseball League. He was selected by the Chicago White Sox in the 2nd round of the 1995 MLB Draft. Simmons would make his Major League Baseball debut with the Chicago White Sox on September 21, 1998, and appeared in his final game on October 7, 2001. On September 26, 1998 against the Royals, Simmons hit home runs from both sides of the plate, establishing a new record for fewest at-bats required to do so.  His fledgling career was derailed, however, when he ruptured his Achilles tendon late in 2000 spring training.

References

External links

Brian Simmons at Baseball Almanac

1973 births
Living people
American expatriate baseball players in Canada
Arizona League White Sox players
Atlantic City Surf players
Baseball players from Pennsylvania
Birmingham Barons players
Calgary Cannons players
Charlotte Knights players
Chicago White Sox players
Cotuit Kettleers players
Fresno Grizzlies players
Gulf Coast White Sox players
Hickory Crawdads players
Major League Baseball left fielders
Michigan Wolverines baseball players
Portland Beavers players
Prince William Cannons players
Rochester Red Wings players
Scranton/Wilkes-Barre Red Barons players
South Bend Silver Hawks players
Sportspeople from Mt. Lebanon, Pennsylvania
Syracuse SkyChiefs players
Toronto Blue Jays players